Recoubeau-Jansac is a commune in the Drôme department in southeastern France, it is 15 km south of the town Die and is located in the arrondissement with same name.

Population

See also
Communes of the Drôme department

References

Communes of Drôme